Opera IX is an Italian symphonic black metal band, founded in the city of Biella by the guitarist Ossian in 1988.

History

Early years: 1990–1995 
In 1990 the band made the first demo tape "Gothik". There were many line-up changes, eventually settling with Cadaveria's vocals, Ossian at guitar, Vlad at bass and Flegias at drums. The band's early occult metal sound was switched to a mix of gothic, death, and black metal. The second demo, which contained 4 songs, led to a contract for a 7-inch EP, which came out in 1993. The first 500 copies were sold out in 2 months. In the meantime, the band filmed "The Triumph Of The Death" containing 2 videos: Born In The Grave  and The Red Death.

At the end of 1993, Silent Bard, a musician with classical background, joined the line-up on keyboard. The band released its first full album, The Call of the Wood, in 1995 under Miscarriage Records. The album contains 5 long songs and has a play time of about 60 minutes. After the CD was released, Opera IX replaced the keyboard player with a new member: Triskent.

Opera participated in A Call To Irons an Iron Maiden tribute album, also for Miscarriage Records. The cover chosen by the band was "The Rime Of The Ancient Mariner". Other bands on the album included Vital Remains and Absu.

Sacro Culto and The Black Opera: 1996–2001 
In April 1998 the band's second full-length album Sacro Culto was released by the Belgian label Shiver Records. There are six songs in total, for a duration of 70 minutes. The new keyboardist on the album is Lunaris. The CD was presented in digipak format and a video was made for "Fronds of the Ancient Walnut".

In the Biellayear 2000, Opera IX signed to Avantgarde Music. In January of the following year they recorded their third album, The Black Opera - Simphoniae Misteriorum in Laude Tenebrarum, at the Underground studios in Sweden. Black Opera sold approximately 18,000 copies. In September 2001 Avantgarde released a remastered The Call of the Wood with new cover artwork and two bonus tracks: "Rimes About Dying Stones" and "Born In The Grave".

Maleventum and Anphisbena: 2002–2008 
Flegias and Cadaveria left the band to form a new musical project, Cadaveria. Opera IX reformed with Taranis on drums and Madras on vocals. Their fourth album, entitled Maleventum, is a concept album about witchcraft and paganism. It was recorded in January 2002 at The Damage inc studios in Ventimiglia.

Madras and Taranis left the band at the same time it was finishing the new album Anphisbena. As of December 2003, the current Opera IX line up features M The Bard on vocals and Dalamar on drums.

New albums 2009–present 
The band has recorded a new album which was planned to be released sometime in the beginning of 2011 by Displeased Records. The drum recording has been completed by Dalamar, the bass recording has been completed by Vlad, the recording of the first guitar has been completed by Ossian. The band also posted two video previews of the new album on YouTube. On 15 April 2011 the band terminated the contract with Displeased Records because the label "would no longer guarantee the conditions in the signed contract". Shortly thereafter, the band signed a contract with Agonia Records. A music video for the song Mandragora has been released.

The album, Strix: Maledictae in aeternum, was finally released in 2012, followed by Back to Sepulcro in 2015.

Discography

Studio albums
The Call of the Wood (1995)
Sacro culto (1998)
The Black Opera: Symphoniae Mysteriorum in Laudem Tenebrarum (2000)
Maleventum (2002)
Anphisbena (2004)
Strix: Maledictae in aeternum (2012)
Back to Sepulcro (2015)
The Gospel (2018)

Extended plays
The Triumph of the Death (1993)

Compilation albums
90-92-93 The Early Chapters (2007)

Live albums
The Triumph of the Death (1994)
Live at Babylonia (1998)
Mythology XX Years of Witchcraft (2008)
Sabbatical Live (2013)

Demo releases
Gothik (1990)
Demo '92 (1992)

Members

Current 
 Ossian – guitars (1988–present)
 Dipsas Dianaria - vocals (2018–present)
 Charon - bass (2018–present) 
 m:A Fog - drums (2014–present)
 Alessandro Muscio - keyboards  (2014–present)

Former 
 Daniel Vintras – vocals (1990)
 Cadaveria – vocals (1992-2001)
 Madras - vocals (2001-2002)
 M the Bard - vocals, guitars (2003-2014; died 2017)
 Abigail Dianaria - vocals (2014-2018)
 Vlad - bass (1990-2014)
 Scùrs - bass (2014-2018)
 Flegias - drums (1992-2001)
 Taranis - drums (2001-2002)
 Dalamar - drums (2003-2014)
 Silent Bard - keyboards (1993-1995)
 Triskent - keyboards (1995-1997)
 Lunaris - keyboards (1997-2006)

Timeline

References

External links
 Official website
 Official page at Displeased Records
 

Blackened death metal musical groups
Italian black metal musical groups
Italian death metal musical groups
Italian gothic metal musical groups
Musical groups established in 1988
Musical quintets
Symphonic black metal musical groups